The Elektrizitätsmuseum (Museum of Electricity) is in Münchenstein,  in the canton of Basel-Country in Switzerland.

The Elektrizitätsmuseum belongs to the electric utility Elektra Birseck Münchenstein (EBM), and was opened in 1997. Exhibits explore the history and development of power production and its use. The collection contains rare historic equipment and is complemented by a laboratory in which visitors can experiment with electric power.

Special Exhibitions 
 „Rechnen unter Strom“, (calculation under current):„From counting frame to electronic brain“ and „Exclusives from the Basler super brains Bernoulli und Euler“, exhibition in 2006.
 „Licht - vom Kienspan zur LED“, (Light from Fatwood to LED).Special Exhibition from 14 June 2009 to 15 December 2009.
 „Kommunikation - Vom Rauchzeichen zum iPhone“, (Communication from smoke signal to iPhone):Special exhibition from 24 October 2010 until 22 May 2011.

See also 
 History of electrical engineering
 History of electromagnetism

References 

Museums established in 1997
Münchenstein
History museums in Switzerland
Technology museums in Switzerland
Electric power
1997 establishments in Switzerland
Museums in Basel-Landschaft